Fort McCoy is a 2011 American drama film written by Kate Connor, produced by Connor and Eric Stoltz, and directed by Connor and Michael Worth that stars Stoltz, Connor, Lyndsy Fonseca, Andy Hirsch, Camryn Manheim, Seymour Cassel, and Brendan Fehr.

The film depicts the life of a barber who is hired by the United States Army. His services are needed for a prisoner-of-war camp in Wisconsin.

Plot
In 1944 Frank Stirn moves his family to Wisconsin to become a barber for the US Army and a prisoner-of-war camp it oversees at Fort McCoy. Bitter that he is unable to fight because he is 4F, Frank takes a stand when a Nazi officer threatens his wife.

Production
The film was shot in California, and La Crosse, Wisconsin.

Release
The film was first shown at Boston, Cannes Independent, Rhode Island, Savannah film festivals. The U.S. and Canadian rights were acquired by Monterey Media in March 2014.

Festivals
Fort McCoy was shown at the following festivals:
Rhode Island International Film Festival
Savannah Film Festival
Hollywood Film Festival
Cannes Independent Film Festival
TriMedia Film Festival
Worldfest Houston
Milan Intl Film Festival
Boston Film Festival
Ft Lauderdale Intl Film Festival 
Stony Brook Film Festival
Tacoma Film Festival
St. Louis Film Festival 
Dublin Film Festival

References

External links
 
 
 
 Fort McCoy at Monterey Media

2011 films
American World War II films
Films set in 1944
Films set in Wisconsin
Films shot in California
Films shot in Wisconsin
2011 drama films
Films about the United States Army
2010s English-language films
2010s American films